Kolubah "Zizi" Roberts (born 19 July 1979) is a Liberian former professional footballer. He began his professional career in 1996 at the age of 17 and played for teams in Liberia, the United States, Switzerland, Greece, and Italy.

Club career

In 1997, Roberts signed for A.C. Milan but never played an official match for them, appearing in friendly competitions and being loaned out to Monza in 1997, Ravenna in 1998, and AC Bellinzona for the first half of the 1999–2000 season.

In January 2000, he signed for Greek side Ionikos FC, finishing out the season before moving to Panionios FC at the start of the following season. In August 2001, he signed with Olympiakos FC, where he found relative success, scoring five times in just eight appearances.
Roberts left for the United States in 2003, signing with Major League Soccer side Colorado Rapids in August. In two years with the Rapids, he appeared in 17 games, scoring six goals.

International career

Roberts was a regular for the Liberia national team between 1997 and 2003. In all, he played 31 games for Liberia, scoring nine goals. In 2003, the final year of his national team career, he was named Liberian Soccer Player of the Year.

Honors

Club
Olympiacos
Greek Championship: 2002

Individual
Liberian Soccer Player of the Year: 2003

References

1979 births
Living people
Liberian footballers
Liberian expatriate footballers
Liberia international footballers
Colorado Rapids players
Ravenna F.C. players
A.C. Monza players
AC Bellinzona players
Olympiacos F.C. players
Panionios F.C. players
Ionikos F.C. players
Serie B players
Super League Greece players
Expatriate footballers in Greece
Expatriate footballers in Switzerland
Expatriate footballers in Italy
Expatriate soccer players in the United States
Sportspeople from Monrovia
1996 African Cup of Nations players
2002 African Cup of Nations players
Major League Soccer players
Junior Professional FC players
Association football forwards
Liberian expatriate sportspeople in Greece
Liberian expatriate sportspeople in Switzerland
Liberian expatriate sportspeople in Italy
Liberian expatriate sportspeople in the United States